The 2018 LFA season was the third season of the Liga de Fútbol Americano Profesional. The season saw all previous teams return with no additional new ones. The Eagles changed their team name to the Mexicas. This would be the first season that saw the championship, the Tazón México held at a neutral site of the Estadio Azul in Mexico City. The league season began on February 16 and concluded on the April 8. The playoffs began on the April 14 and concluded on April 22 with the Mexicas beating the Raptors in Taźon México III.

Participating teams

Preseason Events

Relevant Events
On October 28, 2017, Mr. Juan Carlos Vázquez left the presidency of the LFA; the figure of President was eliminated and the figure of the Commissioner was created, which Guillermo Ruiz Burguete occupied.

On January 16, LFA commissioner Guillermo Ruiz Burguete resigned; the league did not announce his replacement. For operational purposes, the activities of the commissioner were absorbed by the president of the league's board of directors, Óscar Pérez.

On March 3, the players of the Mexicas team went on strike due to the lack of medical insurance and other supplies necessary for the professional practice of the sport, so their game for week 3 against Dinos was suspended.

On March 8, the Mexicas team was fined $657,820.00 MXN(US35,200) for damages caused to the League, its TV partners, its press partners, the Dinos team, and fans attending the stadium for not having presented to play. It was also determined that said party would not be rescheduled and therefore Mexicas would lose it by forfeit.

The salary cap was 1,100,000MXN(US59,000)

Coaching changes
The 2018 season saw all but Mayas replace their head coach

Condors: Enrique Zapata was replaced as head coach by Felix Buendía after a 3–4 season

Mexicas: José Campuzano was replaced as head coach by Rafael Duk, who coached the Raptors the previous two seasons, after a 4–3 season.

Raptors: Rafael Duk was replaced as head coach by Guillermo Gutierrez after a 5–2 season.

Dinos: Guillermo Ruiz was replaced as head coach by Carlos Cabral after a 2–5 season.

Fundidores: Leopoldo Treviño was replaced as head coach by Israel Gonzalez after a 2–5 season.

Draft
On January 13, the 2018 Draft was held in which 47 players were selected who finished their eligibility in Mexican university football

* In exchange for QB Bruno Márquez (2nd year), Raptors gave Condors selections in the first, fourth and seventh round of the 2018 Draft.

Season

Standings
Note: GP = Games played, W = Wins, L = Losses, PF = Points for, PA = Points against, Diff=Difference between pts. for and against

Teams highlighted qualified for the playoffs

Results

* Based on the regulations, the Dinos won the match forfeit with a score of 1 to 0, since Mexicas did not show up for the match.

Statistical leaders

Playoffs

Playoff bracket

Tazón México III

The Tazón México III was held on April 22, 2018, at 4:00 p.m. at the Estadio Azul in Mexico City, with a record attendance for the LFA of 15,000 fans present. Mexicas defeated Raptors 17–0 in a defensive game. This would have been the first LFA championship with a halftime show, however, the group in charge of the show, Panteón Rococó , had to cancel last-minute performance due to Civil Protection recommendations due to the probability of a thunderstorm.

The final between Raptors and Mexicas would have been the last professional activity that the Estadio Azul before its demolition, however, the venue will house more games of the LFA, including the Tazón México IV, since its demolition was postponed to the 2020 year. The MVP of the game was Guillermo Villalobos.

References

2018 in American football
LFA
LFA seasons